Yoine J. Goldstein (May 11, 1934 – March 18, 2020) was a Canadian lawyer, academic, and former Senator.

Born in Montreal, Quebec, his education includes a Bachelor of Arts from McGill University in 1955, a Bachelor of Civil Law (with honours) from McGill University in 1958 (where he was selected as the Articles Editor for the McGill Law Journal), and a Doctor of Laws from the Université de Lyon in 1960. He was called to the Quebec Bar in 1961. He specializes in  insolvency, bankruptcy and commercial litigation. Prior to becoming a senator, he was a senior and managing partner of the Montreal law firm, Goldstein, Flanz & Fishman.

From 1973 until 1997, he was a lecturer at the Faculty of Law of the Université de Montréal. He is a Fellow of the American College of Trial Lawyers and the American College of Bankruptcy. In 1992, he received the Lord Reading Law Society Human Rights Award, and the Lord Reading Law Society Service Award in 1998.

Active in Montreal's Jewish community, he was president of Federation CJA (a funding, planning, and coordinating body of services for some of the 93,000 Jews in Montreal) from 1995 to 1997. He is also a member of the Community Advisory Board of the Concordia University Chair of Canadian Jewish Studies.

Senate career
On August 29, 2005, he was appointed to the Senate on the advice of Paul Martin and sat as a member of the Liberal caucus.

He was vice-chairman of the Banking, Trade and Commerce committee and the Standing Committee on Banking, Trade and Commerce.

During the 40th Canadian Parliament he introduced the following bills: S-219: An Act to amend the Bankruptcy and Insolvency Act (student loans), S-220: An Act respecting commercial electronic messages, S-231: An Act to amend the Investment Canada Act (human rights violations), and S-232: An Act to amend the Patent Act (drugs for international humanitarian purposes) and to make a consequential amendment to another Act.

He retired, per Senate rules, on May 11, 2009, his 75th birthday. He died on March 18, 2020.

References

External links
 

1934 births
2020 deaths
Anglophone Quebec people
Canadian legal scholars
Canadian senators from Quebec
Canadian Zionists
Jewish Canadian politicians
Liberal Party of Canada senators
McGill University alumni
Politicians from Montreal
Lawyers from Montreal
University of Lyon alumni
Academic staff of the Université de Montréal
21st-century Canadian politicians
McGill University Faculty of Law alumni